Angelo Giustiniani (died 26 August 1600) was a Roman Catholic prelate who served as Bishop of Bovino (1578–1600).

On 14 May 1578, Angelo Giustiniani was appointed during the papacy of Pope Gregory XIII as Bishop of Bovino. He served as Bishop of Bovino until his death on 26 Aug 1600.

References 

16th-century Italian Roman Catholic bishops
Bishops appointed by Pope Gregory XIII
1600 deaths